José Alejandro Reyes Cerna, known as José Reyes, (born 5 November 1997) is a Honduran professional footballer who plays as a midfielder for Real España.

International career
He was selected for the Honduras U-20 squad for the 2017 FIFA U-20 World Cup and appeared at every game the squad played as they were eliminated at group stage.

He was selected for the senior Honduras squad for the 2019 CONCACAF Gold Cup and made his debut on 21 June 2019 in a 0–1 loss to Curaçao, as a 76th-minute substitute for Michaell Chirinos.

Honours
C.D. Olimpia
 CONCACAF League: 2017

Honduras Youth
 Pan American Silver Medal: 2019

References

External links
 
 

1997 births
Sportspeople from Tegucigalpa
Living people
Honduran footballers
Honduras international footballers
Association football midfielders
C.D. Olimpia players
Liga Nacional de Fútbol Profesional de Honduras players
2019 CONCACAF Gold Cup players
Pan American Games medalists in football
Pan American Games silver medalists for Honduras
Footballers at the 2019 Pan American Games
Honduras youth international footballers
Medalists at the 2019 Pan American Games
Footballers at the 2020 Summer Olympics
Olympic footballers of Honduras